Çağla Büyükakçay and Maria Sakkari were the defending champions, but Sakkari chose not to participate. Büyükakçay partnered Mona Barthel, but lost in the quarterfinals to Lesley Kerkhove and Lidziya Marozava.

Mandy Minella and Nina Stojanović won the title, defeating Hsieh Su-wei and Valeria Savinykh in the final, 6–3, 3–6, [10–4].

Seeds

Draw

References 
 Draw

Al Habtoor Tennis Challenge - Doubles
2016 in Emirati tennis